Michael McElroy (born 1967) is a Grammy and Tony nominated American musical theatre actor, singer and music director.

Early life and career
Born in Shaker Heights, Ohio, McElroy moved to New York City in May 1990 after earning his BFA in Theatre from Carnegie Mellon University. He made his Broadway debut in The High Rollers Social and Pleasure Club. He has since appeared in numerous productions, both on and off-Broadway,  and in 2004 was nominated for a Tony Award for Best Featured Actor in a Musical for Big River.  He has also been nominated for Drama Desk Awards for Violet and Big River. In 1995, McElroy appeared in the premiere performance of John Adams' opera I Was Looking at the Ceiling and Then I Saw the Sky in Berkeley, California.

In 1999, McElroy became the founder and director of the Broadway Inspirational Voices, a diverse, non-denominational gospel choir made up of Broadway singers. In the fall of 2021 McElroy became the chair of the Musical Theatre Department at the University of Michigan School of Music, Theatre & Dance.

Stage credits

Broadway

Off-Broadway
Violet (1998) – Flick
Hair (2001) – Hud
Some Men (2007) – Marcus and others

Workshops
Spring Awakening (2001) – Masked Man
PandA committee (2011)

Filmography

Film

Television

Awards and nominations

References

External links

Broadway Inspirational Voices Website

American male singers
American male musical theatre actors
Carnegie Mellon University College of Fine Arts alumni
Actors from Shaker Heights, Ohio
Living people
1967 births
Tisch School of the Arts faculty
University of Michigan faculty